Dovzhky (alternative name – ) – village (selo) in Shepetivka Raion of Khmelnytskyi Oblast, Ukraine. It belongs to Hannopil rural hromada, one of the hromadas of Ukraine. 
Area of the village totals is 4,36 km2 and the population of the village is about 952 people. Local government is administered by Dovzhkivska village council.

Geography 

History 
The first written sources of the village have been preserved from the years 1594-1595. But in territory of village are found tools copper-stone age ) (3rd millennium BC).
Direction of the economy of the local population – agriculture and meat dairy farming.

Before the Second World War the population of village Dovzhky was about 2,000 people and was a few Jewish families. 
A terrible fate awaited the Jews of Slavuta district during the fascist occupation of 1941 – 1942. All of them were taken to ghetto and killed by the Nazis.

Until 18 July 2020, Dovzhky belonged to Slavuta Raion. The raion was abolished in July 2020 as part of the administrative reform of Ukraine, which reduced the number of raions of Khmelnytskyi Oblast to three. The area of Slavuta Raion was abolished and merged into Shepetivka Raion.

References

External links 
 weather.in.ua, Dovzhky (Khmelnytskyi region)

Holocaust locations in Ukraine
Villages in Sheptivka Raion